Randall Denley is a Canadian journalist and politician who ran as the Progressive Conservative (PC) candidate for Member of Provincial Parliament (MPP) in Ottawa West—Nepean in 2011 election and 2014 election. He writes for the Ottawa Citizen and National Post as a columnist.

Background

Denley was born London, Ontario, Denley graduated from the University of Western Ontario with a journalism degree in 1973.

Writing career 
Denley spent several years as a journalist and editor for the Owen Sound Sun Times before joining the Ottawa Citizen as a journalist in 1983. In 1992, he moved from the regular journalism beat to a political column with the paper, writing about both municipal and provincial politics.

Denley's first novel, a murder mystery titled Necessary Victims, was serialized in the Citizen in 2004. In 2006, he published The Perfect Candidate, a satire of local municipal politics in which Will Hacker, a former hockey player turned radio talk show host, is bribed by local developers to run a fake campaign for mayor of Ottawa. His third novel, a murder mystery titled One Dead Sister, was published in 2010.

Denley now publishes the occasional op-ed in newspapers like the National Post.

Provincial politics 
Denley took a leave of absence from the Citizen in 2011 to run as an Ontario Progressive Conservative Party candidate in Ottawa West—Nepean for the 2011 provincial election. He briefly returned to the Citizen as an editorial writer after losing the election to incumbent MPP Bob Chiarelli, but retired from the paper in 2012. He ran again in the 2014 election, again losing to Chiarelli.

Electoral record

References

External links
 Randall Denley

Living people
Canadian columnists
Canadian male novelists
Canadian mystery writers
21st-century Canadian novelists
Ottawa Citizen people
Progressive Conservative Party of Ontario candidates in Ontario provincial elections
Writers from London, Ontario
Writers from Ottawa
21st-century Canadian male writers
Canadian male non-fiction writers
Year of birth missing (living people)